The 2021–22 South Alabama Jaguars men's basketball team represented the University of South Alabama in the 2021–22 NCAA Division I men's basketball season. The Jaguars, led by fourth-year head coach Richie Riley, play their home games at the Mitchell Center in Mobile, Alabama as members in the Sun Belt Conference.

The Jaguars are set to play in the inaugural 2022 The Basketball Classic postseason tournament.

Previous season
In a season limited due to the COVID-19 pandemic, the Jaguars finished the 2020–21 season 17–11, 10–7 in Sun Belt play to finish in third place in the East Division. In the Sun Belt tournament, they defeated Louisiana–Monroe in the first round, before losing to Louisiana in the quarterfinals.

Roster

Schedule and results

|-
!colspan=12 style=| Non-conference regular season

|-
!colspan=9 style=| Sun Belt Conference regular season

|-
!colspan=12 style=| Sun Belt tournament

|-
!colspan=12 style=| The Basketball Classic

Sources

References

South Alabama Jaguars men's basketball seasons
South Alabama Jaguars
South Alabama Jaguars men's basketball
South Alabama Jaguars men's basketball
South Alabama Jaguars